Catopyrops florinda, the speckled line blue, is a species of butterfly belonging to the lycaenid family described by Arthur Gardiner Butler in 1877. It is found in the Australasian realm.

Subspecies
C. f. florinda Loyalty Islands
C. f. estrella  (Waterhouse & Lyell, 1914) Australia (Darwin, Northern Territory, Cooktown, Queensland and New South Wales) 
C. f. parva Tite, 1963  Timor, Kissar, Wetar, Letti

Biology
The larva feeds on Celtis sinensis, Trema cannabina and  Caesalpinia bonduc.

References

External links
 "Catopyrops Toxopeus, 1929" at Markku Savela's Lepidoptera and Some Other Life Forms

Catopyrops
Butterflies described in 1877